The Celtic Tenors began life as the Three Irish Tenors on RTÉ's Theatre Nights in October 1995. The group at that time consisted of James Nelson, Niall Morris, and Paul Hennessey.

In 1998, Matthew “The Gill” Gilsenan from Kells, Co. Meath replaced Paul Hennessey and in 2000 the group was signed to EMI Classics and changed its name to The Celtic Tenors. Singing a mixture of Celtic, operatic and harmonized popular songs, the group has traveled extensively with many tours concentrated in Australia, the US, Canada, Germany, China, and the Netherlands. The group performs as a compact vocal group with piano and guitar, also in larger formats such as band and symphonies such as the Toronto Symphony, the Cincinnati Pops, Vancouver Symphony Orchestra, Symphony Nova Scotia and Winnipeg Symphony Orchestra. They have performed at major sporting events; rugby, football, Gaelic football, hurling, ice hockey, tennis, Formula 1 motorcar racing, As well as performing for  Bill Clinton and Kofi Annan.

In June 2006, Daryl Simpson BEM replaced Niall Morris.

The Celtic Tenors have released several records with Decca records, EMI classics, Telarc, Tayberry records and Dara labels as well as self releasing. Their first album, The Celtic Tenors (released in 2000), went on to achieve double platinum status in Ireland, No.1 in Ireland and Germany, Number 2 in the UK, and won them the "Echo Award" for "classical without borders" (classiche ohne grenzen) in Germany. Album releases include So Strong (2001) and The Irish Album (EMI Classics, 2002), including their single which has become the Irish Rugby anthem “Ireland’s call”, PBS special with DPTV (Detroit Public Television Celebrate with the Celtic Tenors 2002, We Are Not Islands (and the same basic album renamed for the USA market Remember Me released by Telarc) (2005) and Hard Times (2009 Tayberry Records), PBS Maryland No Boundaries (2010), Feels Like Home (2011), self-published The Christmas Album (2013).

They signed a deal with Universal Music under the Decca Records (Sydney) label in 2015, releasing Timeless (2016), self-released An Irish Songbook (2019)

References

External links
 
 
 Celtic Tenors on Facebook

Irish tenors
Tenor vocal groups